The Corpus Scriptorum Historiae Byzantinae (CSHB), also referred to as the Bonn Corpus, is a monumental fifty-volume series of primary sources for the study of Byzantine history (–1453), published in the German city of Bonn between 1828 and 1897. Each volume contains a critical edition of a Byzantine Greek historical text, accompanied by a parallel Latin translation. The project, conceived by the historian Barthold Georg Niebuhr, sought to revise and expand the original twenty-four volume Corpus Byzantinae Historiae (sometimes called the Byzantine du Louvre), published in Paris between 1648 and 1711 under the initial direction of the Jesuit scholar Philippe Labbe. The series was first based at the University of Bonn; after Niebuhr's death in 1831, however, oversight of the project passed to his collaborator Immanuel Bekker at the Prussian Academy of Sciences in Berlin.

While the first volume of the series received praise for its "minute care and attention" to textual details, later volumes produced under Bekker became infamous for their frequent misprints, careless execution, and general unreliability. Given these shortcomings, the International Association of Byzantine Studies established in 1966 the Corpus Fontium Historiae Byzantinae to re-edit many of the texts included in the Bonn edition of the CSHB.

Volumes

See also 
Byzantine Literature
Corpus Fontium Historiae Byzantinae

References

Further reading

External links 

 Digitized CSHB on the Documenta Omnia Catholica 
 Fordham Guide to Byzantine Sources in Translation

Byzantine literature
Byzantine studies
Byzantine historians
Series of books
Corpora
19th-century history books